Aage Hansen (born 13 April 1935) is a former international speedway rider from Norway.

Speedway career 
Hansen is a seven times champion of Norway, winning the Norwegian Championship in 1956, 1957, 1958, 1959, 1960, 1961 and 1963.

He reached the final of the Speedway World Championship in the 1957 Individual Speedway World Championship, a meeting in which he was recovering from a dislocated knee.

He rode in the top tier of British Speedway, riding for Ipswich Witches.

World final appearances

Individual World Championship
 1957 -  London, Wembley Stadium - 12th - 4pts

References 

1935 births
Living people
Norwegian speedway riders
Ipswich Witches riders